Mizdej may refer to:
Mizdej-e Olya Rural District
Mizdej-e Sofla Rural District